Petros Heronimosi Adamian (December 21, 1849, Istanbul – , 1891, Istanbul, Ottoman Empire) was an Armenian actor, poet, writer, artist and public figure.

Biography
Adamian's mother died when he was one and a half years old.

He started his artistic career at the age of seventeen, in the play "William the Conqueror." After a first period in his career where he gradually won recognition in the theater groups of Constantinople, in 1879 he was hired by the Armenian Theater Board of Tiflis and the golden period of his career started afterwards in the Caucasus. He would abandon the historical plays and the French melodramas to enter the world of Shakespeare. Since 1879 he performed in Baku, Shushi, Alexandropol, Tiflis. In the 1880s, when the Ottoman Turkish reaction "held the national minorities in scorn", Adamian had an artistic tour in foreign (Russian and Ukrainian) cities, acting both in Armenian and French languages. In 1887 a Russian theatrical critic wrote about Adamian in "Odessky Vestnik": "Not Salvini, not Rossi, not Possart, not Barna, and finally, no world-famous actor has given us such a pure and perfect Hamlet as P. Adamian did." In 1888 he returned to Constantinople. Among his best roles of that period: King Lear, Arbenin (Lermontov's "Masquerade"), Khlestakov (Gogol's "Revisor"), Mikael (Sundukian's "One more victim"), etc. Being a "great Shakespearean actor" and the first Armenian scientific researcher of William Shakespeare plays, in 1887 he published the study "Shakespeare and the Sources and Criticism of His Tragedy Hamlet." He also made translations from Shakespeare, Victor Hugo, Semyon Nadson, and Nikolai Nekrasov.

Adamian suffered from a throat cancer for the last two years of his life. He died in the St. Nicholas Russian hospital of Constantinople.

Siranush, Hovhannes Abelian, Vahram Papazian, and other Armenian actors continued Adamian's theatrical tradition.

The Armenian Drama Theatre of Tbilisi is named after Adamian.

Books
"Petros Adamian", by G. Stepanian, Yerevan, 1956

See also 
Petros Adamian Tbilisi State Armenian Drama Theatre

References

External links
Shakespeare in Armenian, by Sona Seferian
Shakespeare and the Armenian theatre, by Nishan Parlakian, Armenian Dramatic Arts Alliance, 2008
Famous People of Armenia: Petros Adamian
 — Mary Cholakian, "The Artist" // "Planeta Diaspor" journal, 21.02.2000 (in Russian)

1849 births
1891 deaths
Male actors from Istanbul
Ethnic Armenian male actors
19th-century male actors from the Ottoman Empire
Armenians from the Ottoman Empire
Male stage actors from the Ottoman Empire
Deaths from cancer in Turkey
Deaths from esophageal cancer